Patrik Johannesen (born 7 September 1995) is a Faroese professional footballer who plays as a striker for Breiðablik, and the Faroe Islands.

Club career
He has played club football for Tvøroyrar Bóltfelag, FC Suðuroy, Argja Bóltfelag, B36 Tórshavn, Florø and KÍ Klaksvík.

Johannesen left Florø by mutual consent on 18 October 2018. In 2020 he won the double with KÍ Klaksvík. In January 2021 he signed a one year deal with Norwegian club Egersund, which plays in the third tier.  On 25 January 2022 it was announced that he had signed for the Icelandic  club Keflavik. He then signed for Breiðablik.

International career
He made his international debut for the Faroe Islands in 2017.

References

1995 births
Living people
Association football forwards
Faroese footballers
Faroe Islands international footballers
Tvøroyrar Bóltfelag players
FC Suðuroy players
Argja Bóltfelag players
B36 Tórshavn players
Florø SK players
KÍ Klaksvík players
Egersunds IK players
Faroe Islands Premier League players
1. deild players
Norwegian First Division players
Norwegian Second Division players
Úrvalsdeild karla (football) players
Faroese expatriate footballers
Expatriate footballers in Norway
Faroese expatriate sportspeople in Norway
Expatriate footballers in Iceland
Faroese expatriate sportspeople in Iceland